Ivan Kelic (born 29 December 1968) is an Australian former soccer player who is last known to have played as a striker for Melbourne Knights.

Career

Kelic was born at sea.

Before the 1989 season, he signed for Australian top flight side Melbourne Knights after playing for St Albans Saints in the Australian lower leagues.

Playing for Melbourne Knights, he was the league's equal top goal-scorer in the 1990/91 season with 17 goals. However, he missed with his penalty-kick and South Melbourne won the match and the title.

Before the 1996 season, he signed for Singaporean club Tanjong Pagar United.

References

External links
 

Australian soccer players
Singapore Premier League players
Expatriate footballers in Singapore
Living people
1968 births
Soccer players from Melbourne
Australian people of Croatian descent
National Soccer League (Australia) players
Melbourne Knights FC players
Sydney Olympic FC players
South Melbourne FC players
Association football forwards
People born at sea